Virtus is an ancient Roman virtue.

Virtus may also refer to:

Virtus (deity), an ancient Roman deity personifying virtus
The Seal of Virginia that has a female personification of the virtue of virtus
Virtus Pallacanestro Bologna, an Italian basketball club
Virtus Investment Partners, a publicly traded investment manager in Hartford, Connecticut, United States
Virtus Roma, an Italian basketball club
Virtus Rieti, an Italian basketball club
Virtus Casarano, an Italian football club
Virtus Entella, an Italian football club
Virtus Verona, an Italian football club
Bassano Virtus 55 S.T., an Italian football club
S.S. Virtus Lanciano 1924, an Italian football club
Virtus (program), a program of the Roman Catholic Church in the U.S.
S.S. Virtus, Sanmarinese football team
494 Virtus, a minor planet
Conroy Virtus, a proposed American giant aircraft
Volkswagen Virtus, a subcompact sedan/saloon

See also
Virtue (disambiguation)